The Romanian Socialist Party was a minor Romanian political party with a socialist ideology. It was briefly represented in the Romanian Parliament after two deputies, elected on the Greater Romania Party list, joined the organisation in 2002. The two MPs would leave the party the following year in order to create the United Socialist Party. In the 2008 elections, it won 0.01% of the vote in the Chamber of Deputies and 0.02% in the Senate. In 2015 the party name was taken over by the Socialist Alliance Party after the Bucharest Tribunal wrote the party out of the official register of political parties.

Electoral history

Legislative elections

See also
 Communitarian Party of Romania
 Romanian Socialist Party (present-day)

References

Political parties established in 1992
1992 establishments in Romania
Defunct socialist parties in Romania
Democratic socialist parties in Europe
Pro-European political parties in Romania